Tengo Tanto is an album recorded by Puerto Rican singer Manny Manuel. The album was released on 11 September 2007, in Puerto Rico and North America by Universal Music. The first single from the album was "No Me Hagas Sufrir" (English: Don't Make Me Suffer). The second single was "Se me Olvido".

Music video
The video for "No Me Hagas Sufrir" premiered worldwide on the program Al Rojo Vivo con Maria Celeste. In New Orleans, the tropical interpreter shows vocal maturity in his new musical proposal.  With the historic centre of the city as a stage, Manny Manuel filmed video of the song "No Me Hagas Sufrir".

Track listing
"Fuego" - 3:51
"Dejame Saber" - 3:03
"Se Me Olvido" - 3:24
"Yo Voy A Darte" - 3:30
"Tengo Tanto" - 3:24
"Sin Remedio" (ft. Chenoa) - 3:21
"A Una Mujer" - 3:55
"Ay Bendito" - 3:49
"La Fiesta" - 3:09
"No Me Hagas Sufrir" - 3:33

References

'Tengo Tanto', Lo nuevo de MANNY MANUEL | terra
Amazon.com: Tengo Tanto: Manny Manuel: Music
CD Universe Sorry
Manny Manuel filma video de 'Tengo Tanto' | terra

2007 albums
Manny Manuel albums